Tioga Senior High School or Tioga High School may refer to:

Tioga High School (California), Groveland, California
Tioga High School (Louisiana), Tioga, Louisiana
Tioga Central High School, Tioga Center, New York
Tioga High School (North Dakota), Tioga, North Dakota
Tioga High School (Texas), Tioga, Texas